Atyrau Region ( /) formerly known as Guryev Region until 1991, is one of the regions of Kazakhstan, in the west of the country around the northeast of the Caspian Sea. Its capital is the city of Atyrau, with a population of 355,117; the region itself has a population of 681,241, of which Kazakhs make up more than 90%.

History
The Turan lowlands of Atyrau Region were the central homeland for the Malkar "Hun" dynasties of late antiquity.

Geography
With an area of 118,600 square kilometers, it is the second-smallest region in Kazakhstan (Turkistan Region is the smallest). It borders Russia (Astrakhan Oblast) to the west, as well as the fellow Kazakh regions Aktobe to the east, Mangystau to the south, and the West Kazakhstan Region to the north. The Ural River is the border between Asia and Europe and flows from Russia to the Caspian Sea through the region, meaning western Atyrau Region lies in Europe. 

A large part of the region is situated in the oil-rich Caspian Depression. Many oil wells have been drilled in the Tengiz Field and Kashagan Field areas. An oil pipeline runs from Atyrau to Samara, Russia, where it joins the Russian pipeline system. A separate oil pipeline runs from the Tengiz field to the Russian Black Sea port of Novorossiisk.

Atyrau is traversed by the northeasterly line of equal latitude and longitude.

Demographics
As of 2021, the Atyrau Region has a population of 659,074.

Ethnic groups (2021):
Kazakh: 92.86%
Russian: 5.01%
Koreans: 0.48%
Tatars: 0.35%
Others: 1.30%

Administrative divisions
The region is divided into seven districts and the city of Atyrau. The districts are:
 Inder District, with the administrative center in the urban-type settlement of Inderbor;
 Isatay District, the selo (village)  of Akkystau;
 Kurmangazy District, the selo of Ganyushkino;
 Kyzylkoga District, the selo of Miyaly;
 Makat District, the urban-type settlement of Makat;
 Makhambet District, the selo of Makhambet;
 Zhylyoi District, the town of Kulsary.

* Two localities in Atyrau Region have town status. These are Atyrau and Kulsary. Isatay and Kurmangazy districts are in Europe, Makat, Kyzylkoga and Zhylyoi in Asia, while Inder and Makhambet straddle the Ural River which marks the boundary.

References

 National Geographic Atlas of the World, Eighth Edition.

External links
 Official website

 
Regions of Kazakhstan